Wenzhou Rail Transit also branded as WZ-MTR is the rapid transit network serving the city of Wenzhou, Zhejiang Province, China. The first line (S1) has been under construction since November 2011 and was opened in January 2019. The first three lines are projected to cost about 50 billion yuan.

In operation

Line S1

Construction of the Shitan Tunnel of Line S1 began on 11 November 2011, and the rest of the line officially began construction in March 2013. Line S1 was originally scheduled to open in October 2018. The west section of the line ( with 12 stations) was opened on January 23, 2019. The last section of the line ( with 6 stations) was opened on September 28, 2019.

Approved lines
As of January 2021, a total of two lines are under construction: Line S2 and Line S3.

The first phase of Wenzhou Rail Transit received official approval from the National Development and Reform Commission in September 2012. Construction is projected to complete by 2018, at an estimated cost of about 50 billion yuan.

Line S2

Construction of S2 began in January 2016. Line S2 will feature distinct express and local services. It will be finished in 2023.

Line S3
Construction started in April 2020.

The first phase of the Wenzhou Rail Transit S3 Line has 13 stations, including 10 elevated stations and 3 underground stations.

Short-term plans (2020-2026)
On March 21, 2019, the Wenzhou government announced plans for Line M1 and Line M2.

Line M1
Line M1 is a fully underground line with 23 stations. Construction will start in late 2020 and is expected to open in 2025.

Line M2
Phase 1 of Line M2 is a fully underground line with 23 stations.

Long-term plans

Line S4 
Line S4 is planned to run in a northwest-southeast direction, from Tengqiao in the west to Huanghua Station in the east, where it will connect with Line S2. Its total length is projected to be , with 10 stations.

Network Map 
Map showing operational and under construction lines of Wenzhou Rail Transit.

See also
 List of metro systems

References

 
Rapid transit in China
Transport in Wenzhou
Rail transport in Zhejiang
2019 establishments in China
Railway lines opened in 2019